The 2012 Copa Topper was a professional tennis tournament played on clay courts. It was the third edition of the tournament which was part of the 2012 ATP Challenger Tour. It took place in Buenos Aires, Argentina between 22 and 28 October 2012.

Singles main draw entrants

Seeds

 1 Rankings are as of October 15, 2012.

Other entrants
The following players received wildcards into the singles main draw:
  Andrea Collarini
  Tomás Lipovšek Puches
  Andrés Molteni
  Renzo Olivo

The following players received entry from the qualifying draw:
  Juan-Martín Aranguren
  Juan Ignacio Londero
  Simon Stadler
  Antal van der Duim

Champions

Singles

  Diego Schwartzman def.  Guillaume Rufin, 6–1, 7–5

Doubles

 Martín Alund /  Horacio Zeballos def.  Facundo Argüello /  Agustín Velotti, 7–6(8–6), 6–2

External links
Official Website

Copa Topper
Challenger de Buenos Aires